The 1970 Grantland Rice Bowl was an NCAA College Division game following the 1970 season, between the Tennessee State Tigers and the Southwestern Louisiana Bulldogs (now the Louisiana–Lafayette Ragin' Cajuns).

Notable participants
Multiple players from Tennessee State were selected in the 1971 NFL Draft, including offensive tackle Vernon Holland, defensive tackle Larry Woods, and wide receiver Dave Davis. Players later selected in the 1972 NFL Draft include Tennessee State defensive back Clifford Brooks and quarterback Joe Gilliam, and Southwestern Louisiana guard Louis Age. Tennessee State freshman defensive end Ed "Too Tall" Jones would be the number one pick in the 1974 NFL Draft.

Tennessee State head coach John Merritt was inducted to the College Football Hall of Fame in 1994.

Scoring summary

References

Further reading

External links
 1970 Ragin' Cajuns roster & photos

Grantland Rice Bowl
Grantland Rice Bowl
Louisiana Ragin' Cajuns football bowl games
Tennessee State Tigers football bowl games
December 1970 sports events in the United States
Grantland Rice